Frederick Gwaltney "Buddy" McCollum Sr. (March 12, 1912 – April 11, 1978) was an American football player and coach and college athletics administrator. He was the head football coach at the Livingston State Teachers College (now the University of West Alabama) in 1946 and at the Troy State Teachers College (now Troy University) from 1947 to 1950.

McCollum was a member of the Auburn Tigers football team from 1931 to 1933 where he played the tackle position. Following his graduation, he served as an assistant coach for the Tigers in the 1941 season. In December 1941, McCollum was called into active duty with the United States Army to serve in World War II.

On his return, he was the head football coach at Livingston State for the 1946 season and compiled an overall record of four wins and two losses during his tenure. In the following season, McCollum  took the head coaching position at Troy State. From 1947 to 1950, he compiled an overall record 20–18–3 with the Red Wave.

Head coaching record

References

External links
 

1912 births
1978 deaths
American football tackles
Auburn Tigers football players
Auburn Tigers football coaches
Troy Trojans athletic directors
Troy Trojans football coaches
West Alabama Tigers athletic directors
West Alabama Tigers football coaches
United States Army personnel of World War II
United States Army soldiers
Coaches of American football from Alabama
Players of American football from Birmingham, Alabama